Lino Jordan (born 15 May 1944) is a former Italian biathlete. He competed at the 1972 Winter Olympics and the 1976 Winter Olympics.

Jordan was born in Saint-Rhémy-en-Bosses. Together with Mario Bacher and Franco Ceroni, he also finished third in the 1973 Trofeo Mezzalama ski mountaineering competition.

Selected biathlon results 
 1971:
 3rd, Italian championships of biathlon
 3rd, Italian championships of biathlon, large calibre
 1972:
 1st, Italian championships of biathlon
 10th, Winter Olympics 4 × 7.5 kilometres relay (together with Giovanni Astegiano, Corrado Varesco and Willy Bertin)
 40th, Winter Olympics 20 kilometres
 1974: 2nd, Italian championships of biathlon, sprint
 1975:
 1st, Italian championships of biathlon, sprint
 1st, Italian championships of biathlon, sprint large calibre
 2nd, Italian championships of biathlon
 1976:
 6th, Winter Olympics 4 × 7.5 kilometres relay (together with Pierantonio Clementi, Luigi Weiss and Willy Bertin)
 7th, Winter Olympics 20 kilometres
 1978:
 3rd, Italian championships of biathlon
 3rd, Italian championships of biathlon, sprint
 1980: 3rd, Italian championships of biathlon

External links 
 Lino Jordan at sportsreferences.com
 Lino Jordan (Italian), in Mon pays étroubles, p. 29.

References 

1944 births
Living people
Italian male ski mountaineers
Olympic biathletes of Italy
Sportspeople from Aosta Valley
Italian male biathletes
Biathletes at the 1972 Winter Olympics
Biathletes at the 1976 Winter Olympics